The Pacific Green Party of Oregon (PGP) is a political party in the U.S. state of Oregon, recognized by the Oregon Secretary of State. It is affiliated with the Green Party of the United States. The party has occasionally elected candidates to public office at the local level.

The party gained public attention during Ralph Nader's presidential campaign in 2000, which saw Nader garner over 5% of the vote statewide.

History

The party was initially founded as the Pacific Party in 1992, largely in response of the perceived failure of the Democratic Party to provide meaningful opposition to the 1991 Gulf War.

Many of the party's early candidates were also highly involved in the forest protection movement. These included candidate for United States Senate Lou Gold in 1994; Joe Keating for Congress and Andy Davis for state representative in 1996; and Blair Bobier for governor and Karen Moskowitz for U.S. Senate in 1998. Davis and Keating were arrested for civil disobedience at the United States Forest Service office building in downtown Portland during the campaign, chaining themselves to a desk along with local activist attorney Stu Sugarman.

Ralph Nader was the party's nominee for President of the United States in 1996, and his vice-presidential candidate, Winona LaDuke, came to Portland and walked a local picket line in support of raising the minimum wage. In addition to running candidates for office that year, the Pacific Party helped pass initiatives to raise the state minimum wage and expand the Portland area light rail system.

In 2004, Teresa Keane, the Green Party's candidate for the United States Senate, won 2.4% of the vote – more than any other Green candidate for the U.S. Senate in that year. In 2006 Keane was elected Chair of the newly formed Green Senatorial Campaign Committee (GSCC), a seven-member committee elected by the National Committee of the Green Party of the United States to raise funds for senate candidates.

In 2020 the Lane County chapter of the PGP contended with the  PGP Statewide Coordinating Committee, energized by the strength of Lane’s appeal to constituencies on the libertarian and right sides, as well as the left, evidenced by large numbers of signatures collected to support Lane affiliated candidates for Federal office, which horizontally challenged the SCC that was deemphasizing anti-imperialism while credulous on Russia-gate, even as party registration had declined by approximately 20% relative to 2016.

Platform
The party's platform emphasizes environmentalism, economic and social justice, peace and nonviolence, and respect for diversity. The party's platform expresses the following positions:

 Public campaign financing for all campaigns for public office and strict limits on political campaign contributions
 Support for net neutrality
 Support for instant run-off voting, proportional representation in the Oregon State Legislature, and proportional allocation of Oregon's Electoral College (United States) votes by Congressional district with the end goal of electing the President solely by the popular vote with the abolishment of the Electoral College (United States)
 Voting rights for convicted felons and ex-felons
 Passage of a Single-payer health care system
 Protection of a women's right to abortion and supportive of legal physician-assisted suicide
 Establishment of carbon taxes to promote use of renewable energy
 Opposed to nuclear weapons and to using nuclear power to generate electricity
 Support for legalization and cultivation of hemp and marijuana
 Support for a ban on patent claims on naturally originating organisms and plants
 Support for the establishment of a federal Department of Peace
 Support for the release of nonviolent drug offenders from prison
 Opposed to private prisons
 Abolishment of the death penalty
 Abolishment of the state's lottery

Current elected officials
The following are currently elected Green officeholders in the state of Oregon.

 Alex Polikoff, Corvallis Rural Fire Protection District - term through May 2021
 Cindy Johnsen, John Day Water District, Commissioner Position 5 (Clatsop County) - term through May 2021

Election results

Presidential elections

Senate elections

Gubernatorial elections

See also
 List of State Green Parties
 Political party strength in Oregon
 Politics of Oregon
 Elections in Oregon

References

External links
 Official web site
 Green Party of the United States (GPUS)
 Green Party Ballot Status and Voter Registration Totals

Political parties in Oregon
Oregon
Political parties established in 1997
1997 establishments in Oregon